Vera Kuzminichna Kuzmina (16 November 1923 — 22 October 2021) was a Soviet and Russian/Chuvash theatre actress and master of artistic expression (reader). She was decorated as a People's Artist of the USSR in 1980.

Biography 
Kuzmina was born in the village of Yanshikhovo-Norvashi (now in the Yantikovsky District, Chuvashia, Russia) on 16 November 1923. During the Great Patriotic War (1941–1943), she worked near Smolensk, in the Moscow region on logging. Graduated from the Lunacharsky State Institute of Theater Arts (GITIS) in Moscow. The first teacher was the actor of the Moscow Art Theater M. M. Tarkhanov.

From 1947, she served at the Chuvash Academic Drama Theater named after K. V. Ivanov in Cheboksary, was a leading actress of the theatre. She played more than 100 roles on stage. For more than 60 years of work in theatre, she embodied images of Russian and foreign classics, as well as works of national Chuvash literature and drama on the Chuvash stage. Among the female roles, the images of mothers stand out in the performances: "Black Bread" by Ilbekov, "Bloody Wedding" by F. Garcia Lorca, "Siberian Division" and "The Cuckoo Cooks Everything" by   Terentyev, "Narspi" by Ivanov, "Aidar" by  Osipov, "Blackberries Along the Fence" by Boris Cheendykov and many others.

Kuzmina worked on the radio; reading poems, short stories and novellas. She participated in radio and television productions. Her artistic reading is an example of Chuvash stage speech. Since 1952, she has participated in dubbing more than 300 films into the Chuvash language. She was for a number of years the chairman of the Chuvash branch of the Soviet Cultural Foundation.

In 1994, a documentary film "The Cycle of Time" was shot about the work of the actress according to the script by   Alekseev ("Chuvashcinema" and the Kazan Newsreel Studio).

Personal life and death 
Kuzmina was married to Pyotr Khuzangai (1907–1970), a Chuvash poet. She had two children; one son and one daughter. Her son, Atner Khuzangai (born 1948), is a noted philologist and literary critic.

She died after a long illness in Shupashkar, on 22 October 2021, at the age of 97.

Awards and recognition 
People's Artist of the USSR in 1980  
Laureate of the State Prize of the Chuvash ASSR (1991)
 Order "For Merit to the Fatherland"  IV class (1999)
Honorary Citizen of the Chuvash Republic (2003)
 Order of Honour (2014)
Russian National Theater Award "Golden Mask" (2018)

References

External links
 Биография на сайте Чувашского ГАДТ им. Иванова
 Вера Кузьмина: Люблю путешествия и детективы //  Советская Чувашия. 20.11.2008

1923 births
2021 deaths
People from Chuvashia
Chuvash people
Communist Party of the Soviet Union members
Soviet actresses
Soviet activists
Russian activists
Spoken word artists
20th-century Russian actresses
21st-century Russian actresses
People's Artists of the USSR
People's Artists of the RSFSR
Recipients of the Order of Friendship of Peoples
Recipients of the Order of Honour (Russia)
Russian Academy of Theatre Arts alumni
Recipients of the Order "For Merit to the Fatherland", 4th class